African American fraternities and sororities are social organizations that predominantly recruit Black college students and provide a network that includes both undergraduate and alumni members. These organizations were typically founded by Black American undergraduate students, faculty and leaders at various institutions in the United States.

History
Prince Hall Freemasonry (PHA) is the first historically Black fraternal organization.  The first Greek Letter fraternal organization was Alpha Kappa Nu at Indiana University in 1903.  Wilberforce University is where Gamma Phi was established in 1905. Sixty miles away at Columbus, Ohio in March 1905, Pi Gamma Omicron was founded at Ohio State University (formation originally reported in the Chicago Defender in 1905). CC Poindexter, a graduate of Ohio State University, went on to Cornell University, where he established the Alpha Phi Alpha Society. This society became Alpha Phi Alpha fraternity. Established on December 4, 1906, Alpha Phi Alpha is the first Black intercollegiate (having more than one college chapter) fraternity.

Alpha Phi Alpha's success inspired the founding of other intercollegiate Black Greek Letter Organizations (BGLOs). Today, these organizations (fraternities and sororities) are known collectively as the National Pan-Hellenic Council (NPHC), and emphasize public service and civil rights. Some non-NPHC Black fraternal organizations, such as the Swing Phi Swing and Groove Phi Groove fellowships, do not solely use Greek letters in their names.

The first professional Black Greek letter fraternity, Sigma Pi Phi, was established in Pennsylvania in 1904.

Early formation (attempted or not existing today)

Fraternities

Sororities

Non Greek Organizations

See also 
 National Pan-Hellenic Council
 Greek letter society effect on youth identity
Racism in Greek life

Notes

African-American fraternities

Social fraternities and sororities
Fraternities